Duncan Passage is a strait in the Bay of Bengal. West of Duncan Passage is the Bay of Bengal; east is the Andaman Sea. It lies within the exclusive economic zone of India protected by the integrated tri-services Andaman and Nicobar Command of Indian Military.

It sits between The Sisters island off South Andaman Island and North Brother Island off Little Andaman with a minimum depth of 21.9 m. 

Manners Strait is the branch of Duncan Passage that lies between North Cinque Island and Rutland Island.

Islands along Duncan Passage 

Several small islands and islets lie along the passage. North to south, they are:
 North Cinque Island
 South Cinque Island
 Passage Island
 The Sisters
 North Brother Island
 South Brother Island

Nearby major channels and straits

In Andamans
 Cocos Strait
 Ten Degree Channel
 Duncan Passage
 Six Degree Channel

Outside Andaman
 Palk strait
 Malacca Strait
 Singapore Strait
 Sunda Strait
 Lombok Strait

Gallery

References

Straits of India
Straits of the Indian Ocean
Landforms of the Andaman and Nicobar Islands